C-821/19 (Commission v Hungary) was a case decided by the European Court of Justice (CJEU) on  16 November 2021. The CJEU ruled that Hungary had violated EU law by restricting access to asylum and criminalizing assistance to asylum seekers.

Background
The case concerned legislation passed in 2018 by Hungary, dubbed the "Stop Soros law" (named after Hungarian-born philanthropist George Soros). In a separate case (C-78/18) the CJEU had previously ruled that other parts of the Stop Soros law were incompatible with freedom of market rules and the Charter of Fundamental Rights. In a 2020 hearing, Hungary argued that it had not charged anyone under the law.

AG opinion
On 25 February 2021, CJEU advocate general Athanasios Rantos issued his advisory opinion, recommending that the CJEU find a violation in the case.

CJEU ruling
The court largely upheld the Commission's complaint that Hungary had breached EU law. Hungary added an additional inadmissibility criteria to requests for asylum, making such requests inadmissible if the person had passed through any country where they were not subject to persecution or danger. According to European Union law, this is only an inadmissibility reason if the person applying for asylum has a connection to the transit country and can be deported there. The CJEU ruled that this violated EU law because the Procedures Directive  already specified an exhaustive list of inadmissibility criteria, which did not include the Hungarian provision.

The court also ruled that Hungary had violated Articles 8(2) and 22(1) of the Procedures Directive and Article 10(4) of the Reception Directive by criminalizing assistance to asylum seekers who are not entitled to protection under Hungarian law. The CJEU's press release stated, "Criminalizing such activities impinges on the exercise of the rights safeguarded by the EU legislature in respect of the assistance of applicants for international protection". The Hungarian law, according to the CJEU, criminalizes behavior that cannot be viewed as fraudulent or abusive. A private individual cannot be expected to know whether an asylum application will be successful or not, so in practice the law creates uncertainty as to whether any aid to people applying for asylum is legal and deters any assistance to asylum seekers. Furthermore, the law criminalizes assistance to those who do not have a possibility of gaining asylum according to the Hungarian law, even when these people are entitled to asylum under European Union law. In particular, the criminalization of assistance undermines the right to communicate with asylum seekers (guaranteed in Article 8(2) of the Procedures Directive and in Article 10(4) of the Reception Directive) as well as the asylum seeker's right to hire legal representation in asylum proceedings (Article 22(1) of the Procedures Directive).

Responses
David Vig, the director of Amnesty International in Hungary, stated that "Today’s court ruling sends an unequivocal message that the Hungarian government’s campaign of intimidation, targeting those who stand up for the rights of refugees and asylum-seekers cannot, and will not be tolerated". Hungarian Helsinki Committee also welcomed the ruling.

References

External links
Press release
Opinion and judgement

Court of Justice of the European Union case law
2021 in case law
Right of asylum case law